Tazeh Kand-e Nosratabad (also Romanized as Tāzeh Kand-e Noşratābād; also known as Noşratābād) is a village in Chaman Rural District of Takht-e Soleyman District of Takab County, West Azerbaijan province, Iran. At the 2006 National Census, its population was 732 in 156 households. The following census in 2011 counted 980 people in 206 households. The latest census in 2016 showed a population of 851 people in 235 households; it was the largest village in its rural district.

References 

Takab County

Populated places in West Azerbaijan Province

Populated places in Takab County